The Living Museum in Queens, New York City, United States, is an art studio dedicated to presenting the art produced by patients at the Creedmoor Psychiatric Center, the largest state psychiatric care institution in New York City. It is the first museum of its kind in the United States. 

Jessica Yu's 1998 documentary The Living Museum profiles the museum and some of its artists.

See also 
 Outsider Art

Sources 
 History page from the Living Museum website

External links 

 http://www.omh.ny.gov/omhweb/facilities/crpc/visitor_guide.htm Creedmoor Psychiatric Center Patient Visitor Guide] - NYS Office of Mental Health, includes the Living Museum
 Art From The Living Museum at Dabora Gallery
  The Living Museum: Art as Asylum-Bully for You. American Psychological Association Convention 2009
 

Contemporary art galleries in the United States
Culture of New York City
Art museums and galleries in Queens, New York